Blondie's Big Deal is a 1949 American comedy film directed by Edward Bernds and starring Penny Singleton, Arthur Lake, Larry Simms, Marjorie Ann Mutchie. It is the twenty-fifth of the 28 Blondie films.

Plot

Dagwood accidentally invents a non flammable paint. Con men visit Blondie and, while her back is turned, switch cans of it for ordinary paint, hoping to have the special paint formula analyzed.  Dagwood unwittingly paints his boss Mr. Radcliffe's barn with the wrong paint as a test, and with Mr. Radcliffe watching, sets the barn on fire, only to have it burn down, disgracing Dagwood. Blondie then, using an assumed name, is hired as a secretary in the con men's office, where she records their incriminating conversation. As she is about to leave and take back Dagwood's valuable paint, they seize the paint and tie her to a chair as prisoner, but she is soon rescued by a visitor. She rushes to Mr. Radcliffe's office, where the con men are in the process of selling him Dagwood's non flammable paint, which they claim is their invention. She then plays the incriminating recording, exposing them and having them arrested.

Cast
 Penny Singleton as Blondie
 Arthur Lake as Dagwood
 Larry Simms as Baby Dumpling
 Marjorie Ann Mutchie as Cookie
Daisy as Daisy the Dog
 Collette Lyons as Norma Addison
 Wilton Graff as Joe Dillon
 Ray Walker as Harry Slack
 Stanley Andrews as Mr. Forsythe
 Mason Alan Dinehart as Rollo
 Eddie Acuff as Mr. Beasley
 Jack Rice as Ollie Merton
 Chester Clute as Ramsey
 George Lloyd as Fire Chief
 Alyn Lockwood as Mary
 Danny Mummert as Alvin Fuddle

References

External links
 
 
 
 

1949 films
Columbia Pictures films
American black-and-white films
Blondie (film series) films
1949 comedy films
Films directed by Edward Bernds
American comedy films
1940s American films
1940s English-language films